Jennie Raymond is a Canadian film and television actress, best known for her three time Canadian Screen Award-nominated for best actress in a leading role and her two wins ACTRA Awardperformance in the drama series Sex & Violence. She won a Gemini Award for Best Performance by an Actress in a Featured Supporting Role in a Dramatic Series at the 18th Gemini Awards for her recurring role in Blue Murder.

Originally from Halifax, Nova Scotia, she has a BA and is a graduate of the professional theatre programDalhousie University and attended The Royal Academy of Dramatic Arts summer program She has also had stage roles in Halifax, most prominently with the city's Shakespeare by the Sea festival.

In addition to Sex & Violence and Blue Murder, she has also been a lead or had guest star roles in the television series The Associates, Show Me Yours, Haven, Pit Pony and Forgive Me, and the films Love and Death on Long Island, Charlie Zone and Night Blooms.

Awards

References

External links

Living people
21st-century Canadian actresses
Canadian film actresses
Canadian television actresses
Canadian stage actresses
Actresses from Halifax, Nova Scotia
Dalhousie University alumni
Year of birth missing (living people)
Best Supporting Actress in a Drama Series Canadian Screen Award winners